Svetlice is a village and municipality in the Medzilaborce District in the Prešov Region of far north-eastern Slovakia.

History
In historical records the village was first mentioned in 1557.

Geography
The municipality lies at an altitude of 336 metres and covers an area of 31.640 km². It has a population of about 160 people.

Notable spots for sightseeing include Svetlice's Greek Catholic Church built in the 1700s and the Bell tower built in the 1800s.

People 

 Shraga Feivel Mendlowitz, haredi rabbi

References

External links 
 
 
 http://www.statistics.sk/mosmis/eng/run.html

Villages and municipalities in Medzilaborce District
Shtetls